The Alta Via dei Monti Liguri (AV, literally "High Route of the Ligurian Mountains") is a long-distance  waymarked hiking trail in the Italian region of Liguria.

History 
The Alta Via has officially born in 1983 from a joint project of Centro Studi Unioncamere Liguri, Club Alpino Italiano and Federazione Italiana Escursionismo. The trekking path is upheld by the legge regionale (regional law) nr. 5 of 25 January 1993 - Individuazione dell' itinerario escursionistico denominato "Alta Via dei Monti Liguri" e disciplina delle relative attrezzature.

Route 

The Alta Via crosses several nature reserves: Parco naturale regionale del Beigua, Parco naturale regionale delle Alpi Liguri, Parco naturale delle Capanne di Marcarolo and  Parco naturale regionale dell'Aveto. Its highest point is monte Saccarello (2201 m).

References

Further reading 
 Centro Studi Unioncamere Liguri, Studio Cartografico Italiano, Alta Via dei Monti Liguri, Genova, 1983
 Andrea Parodi, Alte vie della Liguria, Andrea Parodi Editore, Arenzano (GE), 2003
 Alta Via dei Monti Liguri, Setti Mirco, Gruppo Editoriale l'Espresso, 2014

External links 
 Alta Via dei Monti Liguri (in English)

Alps
Apennine Mountains
Hiking trails in Italy
Liguria